Clicker may refer to:
Devices
Clicker, a device that makes a clicking sound
Clicker (classroom), a device for collecting feedback from an audience
A slide projector
Another name for a remote control

Other
Boot and shoe clicker, a person who cuts the leather for making shoes and other footwear
Shorthand for clicker game
Clicker.com, a website
A zombie-like enemy in The Last of Us video game